Hypsoblennius ionthas, commonly known as the freckled blenny, is a species of combtooth blenny found in the western Atlantic Ocean.

Description 
This species grows to a length of  TL. it has an elongate body with long anal and dorsal fins. It has small, chisel-like teeth that are useful for consuming algae from tough surface.  It ranges in color from yellowish to green brown.

Distribution
The species ranges from North Carolina in the Atlantic to the Gulf of Mexico and Aransas Bay, Texas. It generally enjoys inhabiting shallow bays and estuaries, dwelling in oyster reefs. It seems to prefer harder bottoms and waters with less salinity. It is more common than the feather blenny along the Gulf Coast.

References

 Goldstein, Robert. American Aquarium Fishes. 1st ed. Vol. 1. Texas A&M UP, 2000. 428. Print.

ionthas
Fish described in 1882
Taxa named by David Starr Jordan